Leander Wilkins (? - ?) was an American soldier who was awarded the Medal of Honor during the American Civil War. Little is known about Wilkins except for his Medal of Honor date and related information. He served in the 9th New Hampshire Volunteer Infantry Regiment as a sergeant and earned his medal on Jul 30, 1864 at the Battle of the Crater, Petersburg, Virginia.

Medal of Honor Citation 
For extraordinary heroism on 30 July 1864, in action at Petersburg, Virginia. Sergeant Wilkins recaptured the colors of 21st Massachusetts Infantry in a hand-to-hand encounter.

References 

Date of birth unknown
American Civil War recipients of the Medal of Honor